Caroline Joy Foot (born 14 March 1965) is an English former butterfly swimmer.

Early life
Foot attended Millfield School.

Swimming career
Foot represented Great Britain at two Summer Olympics: 1988 and 1996. She represented England and won a silver medal in the 100 metres butterfly, at the 1986 Commonwealth Games in Edinburgh, Scotland. Four years later she represented England in the same event, at the 1990 Commonwealth Games in Auckland, New Zealand. A third appearance resulted in 1998 when she participated in the 100 metres butterfly and the medley relay in which she won a bronze medal, at the 1998 Commonwealth Games.

She was a four times winner of the ASA National British Championships 100 metres butterfly (1986, 1995, 1997 and 1998). She also won the 50 metres butterfly title in 1997 and 2000.

A member of swimming club, York City Baths Club, she is known for winning the bronze medal at the 1997 European Championships (LC) in the women's 4×100-metre medley relay, alongside Sarah Price, Jaime King, and Karen Pickering.

See also
 List of Commonwealth Games medallists in swimming (women)

References

External links

1965 births
Living people
English female swimmers
Olympic swimmers of Great Britain
Swimmers at the 1988 Summer Olympics
Swimmers at the 1996 Summer Olympics
Swimmers at the 1986 Commonwealth Games
Swimmers at the 1990 Commonwealth Games
Swimmers at the 1998 Commonwealth Games
Commonwealth Games silver medallists for England
Commonwealth Games bronze medallists for England
Female butterfly swimmers
Sportspeople from London
European Aquatics Championships medalists in swimming
Commonwealth Games medallists in swimming
People educated at Millfield
Medallists at the 1986 Commonwealth Games
Medallists at the 1998 Commonwealth Games